Rob Whiteman CBE is the Chief Executive of the Chartered Institute of Public Finance and Accountancy (CIPFA), he was appointed in September 2013.

Before moving to CIPFA, Whiteman was a Senior Civil Servant in the British Civil Service working as the Chief Executive of the UK Border Agency.

Prior to this role he was the managing director of the local government Improvement & Development Agency (IDeA), a job he had been appointed to in 2010. Between 2005 and 2010 he worked in local government as the Chief Executive of the London Borough of Barking and Dagenham Council. A qualified Chartered Public Finance Accountant (CPFA), previously he was the Director of Resources at the London Borough of Lewisham.

As a non-executive, since July 2022 he is Chair of University Hospitals Dorset NHS Foundation Trust, having held several other NHS appointments. He has served as a Technical Advisor to the Board of the International Federation of Accounts (IFAC), with previous roles including Chair of Audit and Board Member at the UK’s Department of Energy and Climate Change (DECC)

References 

Living people
Chief Executives of the UK Border Agency
Alumni of the University of Essex
Year of birth missing (living people)